I'm in a Phone Booth, Baby is an album by the American blues musician Albert King. It was released in 1984 by Fantasy Records. The album was nominated for a Grammy Award, in the "Best Traditional Blues Recording" category.

Track listing 
 "Phone Booth" (Richard Cousins, Robert Cray, Mike Vannice, Dennis Walker) - 3:54
 "Dust My Broom " (Elmore James, Robert Johnson) - 3:57
 "The Sky Is Crying" (James, Clarence Lewis, Morgan Robinson) - 5:39
 "Brother, Go Ahead and Take Her" (Dennis Walker) - 4:28
 "Your Bread Ain't Done" (Doug MacLeod) - 3:57
 "Firing Line (I Don't Play With Your Woman, You Don't Play with Mind)" (Sir Mack Rice) - 3:26
 "The Game Goes On" (Edward Early) - 3:26
 "Truck Load of Lovin'" (Jimmy Lewis) - 4:19
 "You Gotta Sacrifice" (Michael Llorens) - 4:20

Personnel 
Albert King - lead guitar, vocals
Gus Thornton - bass
Tony Llorens - piano
Michael Llorens - drums
Steve Douglas - tenor and baritone saxophone
Cal Lewiston - trumpet

References

External links 
 

1984 albums
Albert King albums
Fantasy Records albums